The 2011 Penn State Nittany Lions football team represented the Pennsylvania State University in the 2011 NCAA Division I FBS football season.  The team was coached by Joe Paterno for the first nine games until he was fired in the wake of the Penn State sex abuse scandal, with defensive coordinator Tom Bradley taking over as interim head coach for the remainder of the season. The team played its home games in Beaver Stadium in University Park, Pennsylvania, US. They were members of the Big Ten Conference in the newly formed Leaders Division. They finished the season 9–4, 6–2 in the Leaders Division to be co–division champions with Wisconsin. Due to their head-to-head loss to Wisconsin, they did not represent the division in the inaugural Big Ten Championship Game. They were invited to the TicketCity Bowl where they lost to Houston 14–30.

The team was ranked number one in academic achievement out of the top 25 ranked BCS teams.

Pre-season
The team captains for Penn State's 125th season of football were tackle Quinn Barham, wide receiver Derek Moye, safety Drew Astorino, and defensive tackle Devon Still.

Penn State began the season with an unsettled quarterback situation. Sophomore Rob Bolden and former walk-on junior Matt McGloin split starting duties in the 2010 season. Rob Bolden was named the starter for the season opener against Indiana State.

Pre-season awards

Drew Astorino
second-team Athlon Sports pre-season All-American
fourth-team Phil Steele pre-season All-Big Ten
Quinn Barham
third-team Athlon Sports pre-season All-American
fourth-team Phil Steele pre-season All-Big Ten
Jack Crawford
third-team Phil Steele pre-season All-Big Ten
Anthony Fera
second-team Athlon Sports pre-season All-American
third-team Phil Steele pre-season All-Big Ten
Gerald Hodges
second-team Phil Steele pre-season All-Big Ten
D'Anton Lynn
third-team Phil Steele pre-season All-Big Ten
Michael Mauti
first-team Athlon Sports pre-season All-American
first-team Phil Steele pre-season All-Big Ten
Derek Moye
first-team Athlon Sports pre-season All-American
first-team Phil Steele pre-season All-Big Ten
Chaz Powell
fourth-team Phil Steele pre-season All-Big Ten
Silas Redd
third-team Athlon Sports pre-season All-American
third-team Phil Steele pre-season All-Big Ten
Devon Smith
second-team Athlon Sports pre-season All-American
second-team Phil Steele pre-season All-Big Ten
Devon Still
third-team Athlon Sports pre-season All-American
third-team Phil Steele pre-season All-Big Ten
Nick Sukay
third-team Phil Steele pre-season All-Big Ten
Johnnie Troutman
fourth-team Phil Steele pre-season All-Big Ten

Rankings

Schedule
Penn State did not play Michigan, Michigan State, and Minnesota in the 2011 Big Ten football season. The schedule was as follows:

Coaching staff
Joe Paterno - head coach (first 9 games)
Tom Bradley – interim head coach (final 4 games)
Dick Anderson – guards and centers coach
Kermit Buggs – defensive backs
Galen Hall – offensive coordinator and running backs
Larry Johnson, Sr. – co-defensive coordinator/defensive line
Bill Kavanaugh – wide receivers coach/recruiting coordinator
Bill Kenney – offensive tackles and tight ends
Mike McQueary – wide receivers and recruiting coordinator (placed on administrative leave November 11, 2011)
Jay Paterno – passing game coordinator/quarterbacks coach
Elijah Robinson – defensive line
Ron Vanderlinden – co-defensive coordinator and linebackers
John Thomas – strength and conditioning

Roster

Game summaries

September 3 vs. Indiana State

The Nittany Lions defeated the NCAA Football Championship Subdivision, Indiana State Sycamores 41–7. Rob Bolden started for the Nittany Lions at quarterback and shared QB duties with Matt McGloin. The game began with a 95-yard kick-off return for touchdown by Chaz Powell. Silas Redd ran for 104 yards on 12 carries scored two touchdowns.  and fullbacks Joe Suhey and Michael Zordich each had one running touchdown. Third string quarterback Shane McGregor closed the scoring for Penn State with a 3-yard run in the fourth quarter. The Sycamores were able to score the final touchdown of the game against Penn State's third and fourth string defense. Head coach Joe Paterno, still recovering from injuries sustained in a practice collision with Devon Smith coached from the press box.
TV announcers=Big Ten Network Matt Devlin, Glen Mason & Dionne Miller

September 10 vs. Alabama

The third ranked Alabama Crimson Tide, coached by Nick Saban, defeated the Nittany Lions 27–11 at Beaver Stadium. Rob Bolden was once again the starting quarterback and shared playing time with Matt McGloin. Bolden completed 11 of 29 passes for 144 yards and one interception while McGloin was 1 of 10 for 0 yards. Penn State took the opening possession down the field and recorded a 43-yard field goal by Evan Lewis. The Nittany Lions were held scoreless through the second, third, and most of the fourth quarters when Silas Redd scored a one-yard touchdown. Bolden converted the two-point conversion to bring the Penn State total to 11 points.

TV announcers ABC: Brad Nessler, Todd Blackledge and Holly Rowe

September 17 at Temple

Penn State defeated Temple 14 – 10 at Lincoln Financial Field in Philadelphia. Fullback Michael Zordich scored the game-winning touchdown on a 1-yard dive with 2:42 to play in the game. While the offense, once again led by quarterbacks Rob Bolden and Matt McGloin, struggled the defense was able to keep the game within reach. Derek Moye had 7 receptions for 112 yards with all 7 catches being good for a Penn State first down. Chaz Powell and Michael Mauti each picked off one Temple pass and Nick Sukay recovered a fumble. Mauti's interception set up the Penn State offense at the Temple 44 with 8:46 remaining. Bolden led the game-winning drive that was highlighted by two successful fourth down conversions and a Zordich recovery of a fumbled snap between Bolden and center Matt Stankiewitch. Despite the close score, Temple finished with only 197 yards of offense, their fewest since a 27–13 win over Army in 2009, where they had only 195. It's also only the fourth time since 2008 that Temple has finished with less than 200 yards of offense.

September 24 vs. Eastern Michigan

The Nittany Lions defeated the Eagles 34–6. The victory marked the first time in the 2011 season that head coach Joe Paterno coached from the sidelines. He spent the first half on the field and coached the second half from the press box. Rob Bolden and Matt McGloin shared quarterback duties again. McGloin threw three touchdown passes, one to fullback Joe Suhey and two to wide receiver Derek Moye who became the sixth Nittany Lion to have more than 2,000 yards receiving in his career. Bolden threw a 71-yard pass to receiver Devon Smith. Kickers Anthony Fera and Sam Ficken each kicked a field goal. Fera was the first Penn State player to punt, kick-off, and serve as the place kicker in a single game since 1975 when Chris Bahr did the same. The Penn State defense limited the Eagles offense to just two fourth-quarter field goals and picked up three turnovers including an interception by Nick Sukay. Malcolm Willis blocked an Eastern Michigan punt. Linebacker Michael Mauti and cornerback D'Anton Lynn both left the game with apparently severe injuries. Mauti injured his knee and is out for the season with an ACL injury to his left knee. Lynn was placed on a backboard as a precautionary measure and was admitted to the local hospital. Post game reports said that Lynn was able to move his arms and legs and may have suffered a stinger, which caused a burning sensation in his extremities.

October 1 at Indiana

The game against the Indiana Hoosiers was Joe Paterno's 700th game as a member of the Penn State coaching staff. He has been coaching at Penn State since 1950 when he moved to Penn State from Brown University with his mentor and predecessor Rip Engle. The Nittany Lions defeated the Hoosiers 16–10 for Paterno's 405th career win as head coach. Both offenses struggled throughout most of the game. Rob Bolden started for Penn State at quarterback and shared playing time with Matt McGloin. Derek Moye caught a 74-yard touchdown pass from McGloin in the third quarter. Kicker Anthony Fera was successful on 3 of 4 field goal attempts. Chaz Powell had one interception and Devon Still recovered a fumble that was forced by Sean Stanley. Silas Redd led the Nittany Lion ground game with 126 yards on 30 carries. Penn State committed two turnovers in the red zone, Bolden threw an interception to Forisse Hardin and Redd fumbled the ball at the three-yard line.

October 8 vs. Iowa

Penn State defeated Iowa 13 – 3. The victory over the Hawkeyes was just the second win in the series for the Nittany Lions since 2000. Rob Bolden started the game, but played just two series. Matt McGloin took the rest of the snaps at quarterback and completed a 2-yard touchdown to Kevin Haplea. The Penn State defense produced five sacks and three turnovers, one fumble and two interceptions to help control the game. The running game led by Silas Redd and Curtis Dukes ran up 231 yards on the ground to help control the clock and keep the Iowa offense off the field. Joe Paterno, still recovering from off season injuries spent the first half on the sidelines before moving to the pressbox in the second half. Penn State honored the 1986 National Champions at halftime of the game to commemorate the 25th anniversary of Penn State's upset victory over the Miami Hurricanes in the 1987 Fiesta Bowl.

October 15 vs. Purdue

    
    
    
    
    
    
    
    
    

Penn State defeated the Purdue Boilermakers 23 – 18 for a homecoming victory and to go to 6 – 1 on the season and 3 – 0 in the Big Ten. Rob Bolden once again started at quarterback, but Matt McGloin took the great majority of the snaps. He threw one interception that bounced off the feet of receiver Bill Belton and into the arms of the Boilermaker's Albert Evans who returned it 55 yards from the endzone. Silas Redd ran for 131 yards and one touchdown. Backup tailback Curtis Dukes scored his first career touchdown. The Penn State defense came up with three interceptions, two by linebacker Nate Stupar and one by safety Nick Sukay. Starting wide receiver Derek Moye missed the game with a foot injury and coach Joe Paterno, still recovering from off season injuries, spent the entire game in the pressbox.

October 22 at Northwestern

    
    
    
    
    
    
    
    
    
    

Penn State defeated Northwestern 34–24 giving Joe Paterno his 408th career win and tying him with Grambling's legendary Eddie Robinson. Matt McGloin started and played the entire game at quarterback. The first half was an offensive shoot-out and the second a defensive struggle. Despite the fact that McGloin took every snap at quarterback, both Joe and quarterback coach Jay Paterno stated that the competition between McGloin and Rob Bolden to be the starter was still active. The defensive star of the game was linebacker Gerald Hodges. He had a career-high 14 tackles and returned an interception thrown by Bethlehem, Pennsylvania native Dan Persa for 63 yards. Anthony Fera kicked two field goals to go with the four touchdowns produced by the Nittany Lions. McGloin threw touchdown passes to Justin Brown and Devon Smith. Silas Redd and Stephon Green both scored one running touchdown.

October 29 vs. Illinois

    
    
    

Paterno earned his 409th win and passed Grambling State's Eddie Robinson as Division I's winningest coach in what would unexpectedly become his final game at Penn State.  The game at halftime was 0–0, Illinois took a 7–0 lead in the 3rd quarter on a 10-yard pass from quarterback Nathan Scheelhaase to wide receiver Spencer Harris. A blocked punt by Brad Bars set up Penn State's first score of the game, a thirty-yard field goal by Anthony Fera with 7:00 remaining. Matt McGloin led Penn State on the game-winning drive that was sparked by the return from injury of Derek Moye. The Nittany Lions drove 80 yards down the field in the final three minutes of the game. A three-yard touchdown run by running back Silas Redd put the Lions ahead 10–7. Illinois drove into field goal range, and attempted a 42-yard field goal. The field goal hit the right upright, and Penn State won 10–7. Redd topped 1,000 yards for the season while running for 137 yards on 30 carries. Linebacker Gerald Hodges led the defense with 19 tackles, a forced fumble, and two pass break-ups.

November 12 vs. Nebraska

This was the first Nittany Lion's game not coached by Joe Paterno in 46 years due to his firing for his involvement in the Penn State child sex abuse scandal. Penn State fell behind 10–0 at halftime and trailed 17–0 after a Matt McGloin fumble in the third quarter that led to a Nebraska touchdown. Penn State rallied, however, and even had a chance to win after scoring two touchdowns and narrowing the deficit to 17–14. Had Penn State won the game, they would have been two regular-season wins away from a likely Big Ten championship appearance. (They went on to beat Ohio State and to lose to Wisconsin.)  However, a last gasp play from near mid-field ended hopes of a comeback. This game was marked with much emotion with a blue-out (in contrast to the normal white-out) at Beaver Stadium in support of the alleged victims of Sandusky's crimes. Nebraska and Penn State gathered for a prayer at midfield for the victims and the fans showed the support for their team with a standing ovation at the end of the game despite the loss.

November 19 at Ohio State

    
    
    
    
    
    

Penn State defeated Ohio State 20–14. Stephon Green ran for two touchdowns and Anthony Fera kicked two field goals for the Nittany Lions. It was Penn State's first and only win with Tom Bradley as coach. All of the scoring in the game was contained to the first half. Penn State had success running the Wildcat formation with Curtis Drake and Bill Belton taking snaps while quarterback Matt McGloin lined up in the slot.  This victory took the show down for the Leaders Division championship to their final regular season game at Wisconsin. Penn State won the game despite being a seven-point underdog according to Las Vegas bookmakers. It was the first time since 2001 against Northwestern that the Nittany Lions were victorious despite being so heavily favored to lose.

November 26 at Wisconsin

The winner of this matchup was guaranteed to represent the Leaders division in the inaugural Big Ten Championship Game in Indianapolis. Penn State lost to Wisconsin 7–45 to close out the regular season. The Nittany Lions took a 7–0 lead in the first quarter on a 44-yard touchdown pass from Matt McGloin to Curtis Drake. Penn State turned the ball over four times, three fumbles and one interception. The Badgers, led by quarterback Russell Wilson and tailback Montee Ball, were able to convert all four turnovers into scores.

January 2 vs. Houston (2012 TicketCity Bowl)

Penn State lost to Houston 14–30 in the TicketCity Bowl at the Cotton Bowl Stadium in Dallas, Texas to end the season. Houston quarterback, Case Keenum, was the game MVP completing 45 of 69 passes for 532 yards and three touchdowns. Rob Bolden started at quarterback in place of the injured Matt McGloin for Penn State. Bolden, the offense, and the defense struggled throughout the game.

Awards
Penn State's football players were recognized for outstanding academic performance by the New America Foundation's Academic Bowl Championship Series. The team was ranked number one out of the top 25 ranked BCS teams. The criteria in the rankings include the graduation rate of the team as compared to the rest of university, the difference between the graduation rate of African-American players and the rest of the squad as well as the same statistics for the rest of the students at Penn State, and the graduation rate differences between African American players and students. This marked the second time that the football team at Penn State was ranked number one. Chris White was awarded the Ray Guy Award for the nations best Punter. The 2009 team earned the same honor.

Watchlists

Anthony Fera
Lou Groza Award Watch List
Ray Guy Award Candidate
Michael Mauti
Bronko Nagurski Trophy Watch List
Butkus Award Watch List
Derek Moye
Fred Biletnikoff Award Watch List
Nate Stupar
Lowe's Senior CLASS Award candidate
Devon Still
Chuck Bednarik Award Finalist
Outland Trophy Finalist

Players

Drew Astorino
Honorable-mention All-Big Ten
Ridge Riley Award (senior) for "sportsmanship, scholarship, leadership and friendship"
Academic All-Big Ten
Quinn Barham
Honorable-mention All-Big Ten
Richard Maginnis Memorial Award (outstanding offensive lineman)
Academic All-Big Ten
Bardley Bars
Academic All-Big Ten
Brandon Beachum
Academic All-Big Ten
Glen Carson (American football)
Academic All-Big Ten
Jack Crawford
Second-team All-Big Ten (coaches)
Quarterback Club Special Award
Mike Farrell
Academic All-Big Ten
Anthony Fera
Big Ten Special Teams Player of the Week (Oct. 3)
Big Ten Special Teams Player of the Week (Oct. 17)
Big Ten Special Teams Player of the Week (Nov. 21)
Second-team All-Big Ten (media)
Jordan Hill
Honorable-mention All-Big Ten
Gerald Hodges
Big Ten Defensive Player of the Week (Oct. 24)
Big Ten Defensive Player of the Week (Oct. 31)
All-Big Ten (coaches)
Second-team All-Big Ten (media)
Ty Howie
Academic All-Big Ten
Mike Hull
Academic All-Big Ten
Evan Lewis
Academic All-Big Ten
D'Anton Lynn
Honorable-mention All-Big Ten
J.D. Mason
Academic All-Big Ten
Matt McGloin
Big Ten Co-Offensive Player of the Week (Sept. 26)
Shane McGregor
Jim Murray Memorial Foundation Scholar
Derek Moye
Honorable-mention All-Big Ten
Quarterback Club Special Award
Chima Okoli
Honorable-mention All-Big Ten
Academic All-Big Ten
Ken Pollock
Academic All-Big Ten
Chaz Powell
Big Ten Co-Special Teams Player of the Week (Sept. 5)
Honorable-mention All-Big Ten
John Bruno, Jr. Memorial Award (outstanding member of special teams)
Silas Redd
Second-team All-Big Ten (consensus)
Jon Rohrbaugh
Outstanding Walk-on Award (walk-on player who exemplifies total commitment, loyalty, hard work and courage)
Academic All-Big Ten
Ryan Scherer
The Nittany Lion Club Academic Achievement Award (senior with highest GPA)
Academic All-Big Ten
Matt Stankiewitch
Academic All-Big Ten
Devon Still
Big Ten Defensive Player of the Year
Big Ten Defensive Lineman of the Year
All-Big Ten (consensus)
Penn State team MVP
Associated Press All-American
AT&T/ESPN All-American
CBSSports.com All-American
Football Writers Association of America All-American
Foxsportsnet.com All-American
Pro Football Weekly All-American
SI.com All-American
Walter Camp Football Foundation All-American
Yahoo! Sports All-American
Nate Stupar
Honorable-mention All-Big Ten
Quarterback Club Special Award
Academic All-Big Ten
Joe Suhey
Academic All-Big Ten
Nick Sukay
Second-team All-Big Ten (consensus)
2012 East–West Shrine Game defensive MVP
Andrew Szczerba
Robert B. Mitinger, Jr. Award (senior who exhibits courage, character and social responsibility)
Quarterback Club Special Award
Johnnie Troutman
Honorable-mention All-Big Ten
Richard Maginnis Memorial Award (outstanding offensive lineman)
John Urschel
Capital One Academic All-District
Academic All-Big Ten
James Van Fleet
Academic All-Big Ten

Post-season
Seven players were invited to the 2012 NFL Scouting Combine, held February 22 to 28 at Lucas Oil Stadium in Indianapolis, Indiana: Jack Crawford, D'Anton Lynn, Derek Moye, Chaz Powell, Devon Still, Nate Stupar, Johnnie Troutman.

All-star games

References

Penn State
Penn State Nittany Lions football seasons
Penn State Nittany Lions football